Pageant Place is an American reality show that follows Miss Universe Organization pageant winners Miss Universe Riyo Mori, Miss USA Rachel Smith and Miss Teen USA 2006 Katie Blair, (who was later replaced by her successor Miss Teen USA 2007 Hilary Cruz) as they live together in an apartment in New York City. They are guided by Miss USA 2006 Tara Conner, in a chaperonal role.

MTV received high ratings  for the premiere of the show on October 10, 2007. There were plans to continue with the show in 2008 when Dayana Mendoza, the new Miss Universe, Crystle Stewart, Miss USA, and Stevi Perry, Miss Teen USA winners that had been crowned, something that never materialized.

The show also features the song "Beauty Queen Killer" by young artist JoJo. The theme song "It's Alright" was written and produced by Evan Taubenfeld, from Sire Records, and Mike Castonguay.

Episodes

References

External links 
 Donald Trump and MTV planning new pageant reality series
 MTV debut Donald Trump's Pageant Place reality series October 10
 Pageant Place review: The real life of a beauty queen

2000s American reality television series
2007 American television series debuts
2007 American television series endings
English-language television shows
MTV reality television series
Miss Universe Organization
Pageant Place
Television series about beauty pageants
Television series by Trump Productions
Television series by Evolution Film & Tape